Daleiden is a municipality in the district of Bitburg-Prüm, in Rhineland-Palatinate, western Germany.

Geography 
Daleiden is located six kilometers away from the border to Luxembourg. The highest point of the village is called "Hohe Haardt" which is 505 metres high. Further parts of the municipality of Daleiden are Bermichthof, Bommert, Burtdell, Falkenauel, Feder, Kalenbornerhof, Laarberg, Neuhof, Schwabert, Vor der Höh, Zingent and Zinglersseif.

References

Bitburg-Prüm